Lee Young-ah (李英雅) is a South Korean actress and model. She is best known for playing the role of Nguyen Jin Joo in Golden Bride, a 2008 drama that was extended by 14 episodes due to its popularity. It was in the Top 3 Korean Dramas of the South Korean Nielson Ratings during January–February 2008 and the Top 7 for TNmS Ratings.

She is also known for her role in the drama King of Baking, Kim Tak Goo as Yang Mi-sun, the love interest of main character, Kim Tak-goo. She won the 2010 KBS Drama Awards "Best Couple Award" for this role together with Yoon Shi-yoon.

Career
Lee Young Ah began acting when she was 19 years old. She first appeared in the SBS TV Drama I Love You, My Enemy  as well as The Youth in Bare Foot, Golden Apple and Wedding. In the 42nd Baeksang Arts Awards, she won the Best New Actress Award for her role as the young Kyung Sook in Golden Apple.

She also put in cameo appearances in movies such as Ghost Story, Caramel, Two Faces of My Girlfriend and lent her voice in Dachimawa Lee.

In 2006, she got her first lead in a TV series, Love Can't Wait, where she plays a 19-year-old senior in a girls' school who falls in love with a poor college law student played by Hong Kyung-min. In the same year, she appeared in a music video by Eru, titled Black Glasses along with Kim Hyun-joong.

Her next lead role in a drama was Golden Bride in 2007, where Lee plays a young bride from Vietnam. In order to appease her blind mother, she marries a Korean man to search for her father in Korea. The drama acquired high TV Ratings which led to the addition of 14 more episodes.

In 2008, she was cast as the second female lead in the drama Iljimae where she played Bong Soon, a funny and silly swindler related to the past of the male lead. She co-stars with Han Hyo-joo, Lee Joon-gi and Park Si-hoo.

In 2009, she was in the drama Empress Chun Chu where she played Empress Dae Mok.

In 2010, she was again one of the main leads in King of Baking, Kim Tak Goo as Yang Mi-sun. She sang a song in the series titled Love Is. The series earned high ratings and was also shown in the Philippines, Vietnam and other countries.

After her success in King of Baking, Kim Tak Goo, she joined the main cast in Vampire Prosecutor and again in Vampire Prosecutor 2 as prosecutor, Yoo Jung-In.

In 2013, she starred in the short 10 episode drama Unemployed Romance along with Namkoong Min. The drama follows the love story of an unemployed drama screenwriter who ends up meeting and then falling in love with, the worker at the unemployment benefits center responsible for distributing her unemployment checks.

Personal life
In November 2018, it was confirmed by their respective agencies that Lee and her Love to the End co-star Kang Eun-tak have been dating since October 2018. In April 2019, it was confirmed by their respective agencies that Lee and Kang Eun-tak had ended their relationship earlier that year.

Lee Young-ah is due to be married to her non-celebrity boyfriend in March 2020 originally, but due to the COVID-19 pandemic in South Korea, the wedding was postponed to the end of the year. On 23 August 2020, Lee's agency announced that Lee had given birth to her first child, a son.

Filmography

Television series

Movies

Variety shows

Music videos

Discography

Awards and nominations

References

External links
 Lee Young-ah at Big Punch Ent 
 

South Korean television actresses
South Korean film actresses
South Korean stage actresses
South Korean female models
People from Seoul
1984 births
Living people
South Korean Buddhists